Aythorpe Roding Windmill is a Grade II* listed Post mill at Aythorpe Roding, Essex, England which has been restored to working order.

History
Aythorpe Roding Windmill stands on the site of an earlier mill which was standing in 1615. It was probably built in 1779 as witnessed by the inscription Built 1779 on a timber in the mill. The mill was insured in 1798 for £50 and in 1805 for £140. The mill was drawn on the 1846 Tithe Map as having an open trestle. It was advertised in the Chelmsford Chronicle of 10 February 1860 as "for sale to be pulled down and removed by the purchaser". At some point, probably between 1860 and 1868, the mill was modernised. The common sails were replaced by patents; the wooden windshaft replaced by a cast-iron one; the layout of the millstones changed from head and tail to breast; a roundhouse  was added to protect the trestle and provide storage space; a fantail was added to turn the mill to wind automatically, replacing the manual tailpole previously carried. The mill had been fitted with a fantail by 1868, and a steam engine by 1890, driving an extra pair of millstones in the roundhouse. It was working until 1937. The mill was leased by Essex County Council in 1940 Restoration by millwright Vincent Pargeter was completed in 1982. The mill ground its first grain after restoration on 3 March 1982. It was officially opened to the public by Ken Farries on 30 April 1983.

Description

Aythorpe Roding Windmill is a post mill with a single-storey roundhouse. It has four double patent sails carried on a cast-iron windshaft. Two pairs of millstones are located in the breast. The mill is winded by fantail.

Trestle and roundhouse
The upper crosstree is made of two pieces of timber, scarf jointed in the vertical plane, and with an iron plate bolted under the join. There is also an oak plate on one side of the crosstree, which is bolted to the crosstree, a pair of spacers being used as the scarf is  within the horns of the main post. The lower crosstree bears a date of 1869, which is probably the date the roundhouse was erected. It is fitted with a cast-iron Samson head by Christie and Norris, the Chelmsford millwrights.

Body

Sails and windshaft
The windshaft is of cast iron, replacing a former wooden one. It was probably secondhand when fitted as it is longer than is really necessary. The mill has four double Patent sails. The mill would originally have been built with Common sails and a wooden windshaft.

Machinery
The Brake Wheel was converted from Compass arm construction. It has a six-armed, cast-iron centre and wooden rim and it is  diameter. The mill was originally built with the millstones arranged head and tail, and was converted to a breast stone layout at the time the cast-iron windshaft and patent sails were fitted. The wallower is wooden, and was secondhand when fitted to the mill, as was the cast-iron great spur wheel.

Millers
 William Glasscock 1615 (previous mill)
 Joshua Wright 1798
 Joseph Knight 1805
 Tabrum 1833
 Stephen Crossingham 1848 - 1850
 E P Bennett 1866
 James Webster 1874 - 1878
 Charles Large 1882
 Thomas Belsham 1890
 Ernest and John Belsham 1906 - 1937
Reference for above:-

Culture and media
Aythorpe Roding Windmill appeared in an episode of The Protectors titled Triple Cross which was filmed in 1972.

External links
Windmill World webpage on Aythorpe Roding mill.

References

Post mills in the United Kingdom
Grinding mills in the United Kingdom
Windmills completed in 1779
Grade II* listed buildings in Essex
Museums in Essex
Mill museums in England
Windmills in Essex
Uttlesford
Grade II* listed windmills